Agarathirumalam  is a village in the Nannilam taluk of Tiruvarur district in Tamil Nadu, India.

Demographics 

As per the 2001 census, Agarathirumalam had a population of 4,177 with 2,056 males and 2,121 females. The sex ratio was 1032. The literacy rate was 88.63.there is 5 hamlet 
1.poonthottam
2.viravadi
3.agarathirumalam
4.varakur
5.mottathur
Also poonthottam is big hamlet near by koothanur saraswathi amman and adhivinayagar sethalapathi also world famous temple
Poonthottam schools govt hr sec school, Govt primary school, 
Saraswthi vidyalaya school and lalidhambigai matriculation hr sec school

References 

 

Villages in Tiruvarur district